Bijairaghogarh was a princely state in India. It was disestablished due to its participation in the Indian Rebellion of 1857.

See also
List of princely states of British India (alphabetical)
List of princely states of British India (by region)

References

Princely states of India
1826 establishments in India
1858 disestablishments in India